San Antonito, New Mexico may refer to the following places in New Mexico, United States:

 San Antonito, Bernalillo County, New Mexico, a census-designated place
 San Antonito, Socorro County, New Mexico, a census-designated place